Japanese Cartoon is an American rock band that was formed in 2008 by rapper Wasalu Muhammad Jaco, otherwise known by his stage name Lupe Fiasco. The band consists of Jaco (Vocals) who can be heard singing in a Mockney accent for some songs, Graham Burris (Bass), Matt Nelson (Keyboard), and Le Messie (Production). Their album In the Jaws of the Lords of Death was released July 16, 2010 as a free online download from their website.

History
Wasalu Jaco (Lupe Fiasco) and Le Messie have been collaborating since 2004. Other musicians who collaborated on the album include Chris Gelbuda (Matthew Santos Band), Jonathan Marks (Hey Champ), Robert Tucker (Matthew Santos Band), Wolfie, Ian Astbury, Erik Hammer, and Bam Alexander.

In the Jaws of the Lords of Death

Discography
Studio albums
2010: "In the Jaws of the Lords of Death"

Singles
2009: "ARMY"
2010: "Heirplanes"

References
MTV.com reports of Lupe's new body of work "Japanese Cartoon"
Kanye West supports Japanese Cartoon.
PigeonsAndPlanes.com report on "In the Jaws of the Lords of Death" Album Launch.
The Couch Sessions report on "Japanese Cartoon — Album Launch".
MTV article on Japanese Cartoon.
NME article on Japanese Cartoon.
Billboard.com mentions Ian Astbury of The Cult's collaborative effort with Lupe Fiasco on Japanese Cartoon.

Footnotes

External links

 

American electronic musicians
Post-punk revival music groups
American indie rock groups